The National Council of Bessarabia was a separatist organisation was headed by Dmitriy Zatuliveter, of the previously obscure Organization of Transnistrians in Ukraine. It arose in 2014, following the Russian military intervention in Ukraine.

Overview
The group released a manifesto on a Russian-registered website in which it decried "discrimination" against ethnic minorities in the region, and called for far greater autonomy in the Budjak region  even while nominally rejecting separatism. Ukrainian authorities took swift action, with the SBU making two dozen arrests. This led one Ukrainian site to claim that the movement had been "smothered in its cradle".

Party of Regions and Bulgarian minority leader in the Budjak, Anton Kisse, have been denying any connection to the movement and even rejected it.

There have been some speculation that the organisation sought to ultimately create a "Bessarabian People's Republic" and link with separatists in Moldova's Gagauzia and Transnistria. However, the lack of a land connection between Budjak and the latter was crucial in the project's demise.

See also
 Luhansk People's Republic
 Donetsk People's Republic
 Republic of Stakhanov
 Luhansk status referendum, 2014
 2014 pro-Russian conflict in Ukraine
 Novorossiya (confederation)

References

History of Odesa Oblast
2014 pro-Russian unrest in Ukraine
Separatism in Ukraine
Russian irredentism